Issoire Aviation, established in Issoire, France, 30 km (19 mi) from Clermont-Ferrand, is an aircraft manufacturer founded in 1978 to take on the work of Wassmer Aviation.  It was rebuilt by Philippe Moniot in 1995 and is today a subsidiary of the group Rex Composite.

Issoire Aviation creates composite materials, notably for aviation (such as components in the Airbus, helicopters, the Eurocopter, and also the Mirage).  It also produces composite light aircraft, the APM 20 Lionceau (2 seats), the APM 30 Lion (three seats), and is developing the APM 40 Simba (four seats).

With the construction of the Lionceau, Issoire Aviation built the first all carbon airplane to be certified in the Very Light Aircraft (VLA) category.

Products
 Issoire APM 20 Lionceau
 Issoire APM 30 Lion
 Issoire APM 40 Simba

References

Aircraft manufacturers of France
Manufacturing companies established in 1978
Companies based in Auvergne-Rhône-Alpes
French companies established in 1978